Network Access Point (NAP) of the Americas (also called MI1) is a massive, six-story, 750,000 square foot data center and Internet exchange point in Miami, Florida, operated by Equinix. It is one of the world's largest data centers and among the 10th most interconnected data centers in the United States. It is located at 50 NE 9th Street in downtown Miami.

The facility is home to 160 network carriers and is a pathway for data traffic from the Caribbean and South and Central America to more than 150 countries. It is also home to one of the K-roots of the Domain Name System.

The NAP of the Americas is built 32 feet above sea level and is designed to withstand Category 5 hurricane-level winds. It provides access to 15 subsea cable landings and serves as a relay for the U.S. Department of State's Diplomatic Telecommunications Service.

History 
The NAP of the Americas was built to serve as a major hub for network traffic between the United States and Latin America. It was also known as Verizon Terremark and was operated by Terremark Worldwide (TRMK), a subsidiary of Verizon Communications. In 2016, the building was purchased by Equinix Inc. for $3.6 billion.

Tenants 
The center is Equinix Miami International Business Exchange (IBX) data facility (Equinix MI1 IBX), offering direct peering access to more than 600 Equinix business and enterprise customers, including more than 160 enterprises and 135 networks, cloud and IT services. Peering networks include AWS, Microsoft Azure, Google Cloud Platform, IBM Cloud, Oracle, Voxility, INAP.

See also 
 List of Internet exchange points

References

External links 
 NAP of the Americas

Data centers
Internet exchange points in the United States
Buildings and structures in Miami
Buildings and structures completed in 2001
Telecommunications buildings in the United States
Verizon Communications
2001 establishments in Florida